The Manipur Pradesh Congress Committee (or Manipur PCC) is the unit of the Indian National Congress for the state of Manipur, India.
Its head office is situated at the Congress Bhawan, B.T. Road, Imphal.

List of Presidents

Manipur Legislative Assembly election

Structure and Composition

References

Indian National Congress by state or union territory
Political parties in Manipur